Dmitri Vasilyevich Golubev (born 24 September 1971) is a Russian football manager and a former player.

Club career
Golubev played in the Russian Premier League with FC Lokomotiv Nizhny Novgorod and in the Russian First Division with FC Torpedo Arzamas.

References

External links
 

1971 births
People from Vyksa
Living people
Soviet footballers
Russian footballers
FC Lokomotiv Nizhny Novgorod players
Russian Premier League players
Russian football managers
Association football forwards
Sportspeople from Nizhny Novgorod Oblast